The "Theme from Star Trek" (originally scored under the title "Where No Man Has Gone Before") is an instrumental musical piece composed by Alexander Courage for Star Trek, the science fiction television series created by Gene Roddenberry and originally aired between September 8, 1966, and June 3, 1969.

History
The music was played over both the opening and closing credits of the original series. The opening credits begin with the now-famous "where no man has gone before" monologue recited by series star William Shatner, accompanied by an opening fanfare. The main theme begins, punctuated at several points by the Enterprise flying toward and past the camera with a "whoosh" sound for dramatic effect, created vocally by Courage himself. A slightly longer version of the theme, minus the eight-note fanfare, was played over the closing credits, which were overlaid on a series of stills from various episodes.

Courage has said his inspiration for the main part of the theme was the Richard Whiting song "Beyond the Blue Horizon," giving him the idea for a song which was a "long thing that...keeps going out into space...over a fast moving accompaniment."

The unaired pilot "The Cage" used a wordless rendition of the melody line, sung by soprano Loulie Jean Norman with flute and organ, over an orchestral arrangement. When originally composed (and as heard in "The Cage"), Courage had Norman's vocalizations and the various instruments mixed equally to produce what Courage described as a unique "'what is that that I'm hearing?' sound." According to Courage, however, Gene Roddenberry had the mix changed to bring up the female vocal, after which Courage felt the theme sounded like a soprano solo. Finally, for the third season it was remixed again, this time emphasizing the organ.

The first several episodes, without any vocals, was a concerto-like solo of an electric violin playing the melodic line. Norman's vocal was restored for the remainder of the season. Producer Herbert Solow recalled that Norman had been hired under a Screen Actors Guild agreement and that she would receive rerun fees for her part in the theme. For the second season onwards, her vocalization was dropped from the theme. Solow regretted the choice and composer Courage was not informed until twenty-seven years later.

The unaired version of the second pilot episode used an entirely different main title theme (Star Trek was the first series in American television history for which a network, NBC in this case, requested and paid for a second pilot episode), also composed by Courage. This version of the theme never aired for when the second pilot was re-edited for broadcast it received the series standard titles and the original theme, minus the William Shatner opening narration (this was changed for home video) .

In 2006, CBS began syndicating a "remastered" version of the series with numerous changes, including a re-recording of the theme music, which was used for all episodes of the series. Elin Carlson, a professional singer and lifetime Star Trek fan, recorded the replacement for Norman's vocalization.

Over time, the show's theme music has become immediately recognizable, even by many people who have never seen the program. Portions of the original theme have been used in subsequent Star Trek series and motion pictures. For 1979's Star Trek: The Motion Picture, scored by Jerry Goldsmith, Alexander Courage provided additional cues featuring his theme, where it softly accompanies the "captain's log" scenes. Dennis McCarthy reused the original theme's fanfare when he reworked Goldsmith's main theme for use as Star Trek: The Next Generation's theme music, where the fanfare precedes Goldsmith's theme. Most of the subsequent Star Trek motion pictures' main title themes started with the fanfare before segueing into music composed specially for the given film. 2009's Star Trek broke with this tradition; instead, composer Michael Giacchino used the opening notes sparingly in the movie, but featured an arrangement of the theme in the film's end credits. All the Star Trek feature films to date use the fanfare at some point.

The spin-off series Star Trek: Discovery (2017-), originally set 10 years before the original series, has featured a new recording of the theme twice: during the closing credits of the Season 1 finale episode "Will You Take My Hand?" (following the reintroduction of the U.S.S. Enterprise), and again at the start of the Season 2 episode "If Memory Serves" during a recap of "The Cage", of which the Discovery episode is a direct sequel.

Lyrics 
Without Courage's knowledge, Roddenberry wrote amateurish  lyrics to the theme — not in the expectation that they would ever be sung, or indeed ever be made publicly available, but so that he could be officially registered as the lyricist of the theme and hence claim half the performance royalties. Although there was never any litigation, Courage later commented that he considered Roddenberry's conduct unethical. Roddenberry was quoted as responding, "Hey, I have to get some money somewhere. I'm sure not gonna get it out of the profits of Star Trek.". These lyrics were published in the book The Making of Star Trek by Roddenberry and Stephen Whitfield, and were featured in an issue of the DC Comics Star Trek comic book, "performed" by the character Uhura.

Series associate producer Robert Justman noted that work on the film Doctor Dolittle kept Courage from working on more than two episodes of the first season. Justman claims he was unable to convince Courage to return for the second season and believed that Courage lost enthusiasm for the series due to the "royalty" issue. This is in contradiction with Courage doing work on the show before the show's second season; conducting thirty minutes of library music (much of it newly composed) on June 16, 1967, including a new arrangement of the Star Trek theme; and returning again for the third season to score the episodes "The Enterprise Incident" and "Plato's Stepchildren".

Other recordings and uses
 Contrary to many claims, part of the theme was not copied for use in the television series Twelve O'Clock High. While there is a recurring musical motif by Dominic Frontiere that sounds quite similar to eight notes of the Star Trek theme, that motif appeared as early as the fifth episode of that series ("Climate of Doubt") which aired October 23, 1964, two months before the Star Trek pilot episode "The Cage" commenced production. As such, it is not the Trek theme as it pre-dates the scoring of that pilot.
In the 1970s, Nichelle Nichols, who portrayed Uhura on the original series, recorded a disco version of the song with lyrics different from Roddenberry's.
 Van McCoy released an instrumental disco version of the song on his 1976 album The Real McCoy.
 Todd Rundgren's band, Utopia, released a disco version of the song on their 1976 album, Disco Jets.
 Jazz trumpeter Maynard Ferguson recorded a fusion version of the tune with his big band, first released on his Conquistador album in January 1977. This recording was later used as the opening theme for The Larry King Show on the Mutual Radio Network, and was so popular that King would occasionally play the entire song at the end of the show.
 The theme was used as the breakaway music for the aircraft carrier  for many years, until it was replaced by the theme from Star Trek: The Motion Picture.
 In 1992, Austrian dance act Edelweiss had a hit with the number "Starship Edelweiss," which used the theme as its melodic base.
 In the movie Wayne's World, Garth Algar (Dana Carvey) is heard whistling the Star Trek theme while lying on top of the hood of an AMC Pacer. While looking at the stars, he says, "Sometimes I wish I could boldly go where no one's gone before."
 At the 2005 Emmys, Shatner and operatic singer Frederica von Stade performed a live version of the theme, with Shatner reciting the opening monologue and von Stade singing the wordless melody line.
 The 2003 release Magical Moods of the Theremin, by lounge act Project: Pimento, includes the theme performed with lyrics, and a theremin. (The title theme recordings for the TV series are often erroneously believed to feature a theremin.)
 In the 2006 film RV, Jeff Daniels's character has an RV with a horn that uses a snippet of the theme.
 In 2007, some TV ads for the Hummer H3 featured the theme recording used in the second and third seasons.
 In 2009, the theme was used as the wake-up call for the crew of mission STS-125 aboard the Space Shuttle Atlantis.
 On March 7, 2011, Shatner, in character as Kirk, voiced a wake-up call for the crew of STS-133 in the Space Shuttle Discovery on its final day docked to the International Space Station. His call at 0723 UTC, reminiscent of the over-voicing on the original Star Trek series, was backed by the theme as he said, "Space, the final frontier. These have been the voyages of the Space Shuttle Discovery. Her 30 year mission: To seek out new science. To build new outposts. To bring nations together on the final frontier. To boldly go, and do, what no spacecraft has done before."
 Tenacious D has covered the theme live, with the original lyrics, on several occasions.
 In at least one episode of the Big Bang Theory, Sheldon is seen playing the theme song on a theremin.

References

External links

Star Trek
Star Trek: The Original Series
Music based on Star Trek
Songs written for films
1966 instrumentals